Methylenetriphenylphosphorane is an organophosphorus compound with the formula Ph3PCH2. It is the parent member of the phosphorus ylides, popularly known as Wittig reagents. It is a highly polar, highly basic species.

Preparation and use
Methylenetriphenylphosphorane is prepared from methyltriphenylphosphonium bromide by its deprotonation using a strong base like butyllithium:
Ph3PCH3Br + BuLi → Ph3PCH2 + LiBr + BuH
The phosphorane is generally not isolated, instead it is used in situ.  The estimated pKa of this carbon acid is near 15.
Potassium tert-butoxide has been used in place of butyl lithium. Sodium amide has also been used a base.

Methylenetriphenylphosphorane is used to replace oxygen centres in aldehydes and ketones with a methylene group, i.e., a methylenation:
R2CO + Ph3PCH2 → R2C=CH2 + Ph3PO
The phosphorus-containing product is triphenylphosphine oxide.

Structure
Crystallographic characterization of the colourless ylide reveals that the phosphorus atom is approximately tetrahedral. The PCH2 centre is planar and the P=CH2 distance is 1.661 Å, which is much shorter than the P-Ph distances (1.823 Å). The compound is usually described as a combination of two resonance structures:
Ph3P+CH2− ↔ Ph3P=CH2

Uses

Methylenetriphenylphosphorane has become a standard tool for synthetic organic chemists.

Related reagents
 (Chloromethylene)triphenylphosphorane
 Methoxymethylenetriphenylphosphine
 Carbomethoxymethylenetriphenylphosphorane

References

Organophosphorus compounds